Harmony Encores is an album recorded by The Chordettes and released in 1952 by Columbia Records as catalog number CL-6218.

This album was reissued, together with The Chordettes Sing Your Requests, as a compact disc in 2002.

Track listing

1952 debut albums
Columbia Records albums
The Chordettes albums
Albums produced by Archie Bleyer